The 1942 VFL season was the 46th season of the Victorian Football League (VFL), the highest level senior Australian rules football competition in Victoria.

Played during the peak of World War II, only eleven of the league's twelve clubs competed, with  withdrawing due to travel restrictions. The season ran from 9 May until 19 September, and comprised a home-and-away season in which each club played either 14 or 15 games, followed by a finals series featuring the top four clubs.

The premiership was won by the Essendon Football Club for the seventh time, after it defeated  by 53 points in the 1942 VFL Grand Final.

Influence of World War II
World War II had many effects on the organisation of football in Australia:

Geelong was unable to compete in the competition because of wartime travel restrictions. Temporary transfers to other clubs were available to Geelong players (limit of three per club). 
Melbourne and Collingwood struggled to field a team, and at one stage considered amalgamating into a joint team, however they were both ultimately able to compete.
Hawthorn and Collingwood withdrew their teams from the reserves competition.
Available servicemen were often called upon to make up the numbers – this accounts for the drop in form of the Melbourne team, having previously won three premierships in a row.
The VFA went into recess, and any eligible players were given temporary league permits.
The Brownlow Medal was suspended until 1946. 
Many ground changes were also forced upon teams, as their usual home grounds were used in the war effort. The new grounds used were Yarraville Oval (Footscray), Toorak Park (St Kilda), Punt Road Oval (Melbourne) and Princes Park (South Melbourne).
Government regulations meant the traditional matches on the King's Birthday public holiday could not be played until 1946.

Premiership season
In 1942, the VFL competition consisted of eleven teams of 18 on-the-field players each, plus one substitute player, known as the 19th man. A player could be substituted for any reason; however, once substituted, a player could not return to the field of play under any circumstances.

Teams played each other in a home-and-away season of 16 rounds.

The determination of the 1942 season's fixtures was complicated by the fact that when the VFL decided to proceed with senior football on 1 April, it was not known which grounds would be available. All 1941 grounds except Windy Hill and the Brunswick Street Oval were candidates for long-term appropriation by the military, and the VFL announced that unless three grounds were available, it would not play the season. Consequently, each round's fixture through the first eleven weeks was set only on the previous Wednesday week, rather than being pre-determined at the start of the season. Ultimately the Melbourne Cricket Ground, the Lake Oval, the Western Oval, and the Junction Oval all became unavailable; but, several Victorian Football Association grounds became available when the VFA announced on 21 April that it was going into recess, resulting in St Kilda and Footscray moving to Toorak Park and Yarraville Oval respectively, and the remaining ground losses were managed by Melbourne sharing the Punt Road Oval with Richmond and South Melbourne sharing Princes Park with Carlton.

During the first eleven rounds, each team played each other once and had one bye. The remaining five rounds (Rounds 12 to 16) featured the same matches as Rounds 1 to 5. This resulted in an uneven fixture in which six teams played 15 matches, and five teams played 14 matches. Teams were awarded four premiership points for each bye, so the teams with an extra bye were favoured by this draw.

Once the 16 round home-and-away season had finished, the 1942 VFL Premiers were determined by the specific format and conventions of the Page–McIntyre system.

Round 1

|- bgcolor="#CCCCFF"
| Home team
| Home team score
| Away team
| Away team score
| Venue
| Crowd
| Date
|- bgcolor="#FFFFFF"
| 
| 13.15 (93)
| 
| 18.19 (127)
| Glenferrie Oval
| 5,000
| 9 May 1942
|- bgcolor="#FFFFFF"
| 
| 14.13 (97)
| 
| 10.12 (72)
| Brunswick Street Oval
| 8,000
| 9 May 1942
|- bgcolor="#FFFFFF"
| 
| 25.14 (164)
| 
| 16.14 (110)
| Windy Hill
| 8,000
| 9 May 1942
|- bgcolor="#FFFFFF"
| 
| 19.17 (131)
| 
| 16.15 (111)
| Punt Road Oval
| 14,000
| 9 May 1942
|- bgcolor="#FFFFFF"
| 
| 18.25 (133)
| 
| 14.11 (95)
| Princes Park
| 8,000
| 9 May 1942

Round 2

|- bgcolor="#CCCCFF"
| Home team
| Home team score
| Away team
| Away team score
| Venue
| Crowd
| Date
|- bgcolor="#FFFFFF"
| 
| 18.9 (117)
| 
| 30.16 (196)
| Punt Road Oval
| 20,000
| 16 May 1942
|- bgcolor="#FFFFFF"
| 
| 8.11 (59)
| 
| 13.21 (99)
| Princes Park
| 16,000
| 16 May 1942
|- bgcolor="#FFFFFF"
| 
| 16.13 (109)
| 
| 9.17 (71)
| Toorak Park
| 5,500
| 16 May 1942
|- bgcolor="#FFFFFF"
| 
| 14.10 (94)
| 
| 17.13 (115)
| Arden Street Oval
| 5,500
| 16 May 1942
|- bgcolor="#FFFFFF"
| 
| 12.16 (88)
| 
| 14.8 (92)
| Yarraville Oval
| 10,000
| 16 May 1942

Round 3

|- bgcolor="#CCCCFF"
| Home team
| Home team score
| Away team
| Away team score
| Venue
| Crowd
| Date
|- bgcolor="#FFFFFF"
| 
| 20.13 (133)
| 
| 11.11 (77)
| Brunswick Street Oval
| 7,000
| 23 May 1942
|- bgcolor="#FFFFFF"
| 
| 22.24 (156)
| 
| 11.16 (82)
| Princes Park
| 6,500
| 23 May 1942
|- bgcolor="#FFFFFF"
| 
| 5.11 (41)
| 
| 17.15 (117)
| Glenferrie Oval
| 5,000
| 23 May 1942
|- bgcolor="#FFFFFF"
| 
| 25.25 (175)
| 
| 5.7 (37)
| Punt Road Oval
| 11,500
| 23 May 1942
|- bgcolor="#FFFFFF"
| 
| 11.9 (75)
| 
| 11.4 (70)
| Windy Hill
| 13,000
| 23 May 1942

Round 4

|- bgcolor="#CCCCFF"
| Home team
| Home team score
| Away team
| Away team score
| Venue
| Crowd
| Date
|- bgcolor="#FFFFFF"
| 
| 12.8 (80)
| 
| 8.17 (65)
| Arden Street Oval
| 12,000
| 30 May 1942
|- bgcolor="#FFFFFF"
| 
| 13.9 (87)
| 
| 20.16 (136)
| Victoria Park
| 6,500
| 30 May 1942
|- bgcolor="#FFFFFF"
| 
| 13.13 (91)
| 
| 9.14 (68)
| Princes Park
| 14,000
| 30 May 1942
|- bgcolor="#FFFFFF"
| 
| 11.17 (83)
| 
| 25.13 (163)
| Toorak Park
| 9,000
| 30 May 1942
|- bgcolor="#FFFFFF"
| 
| 16.15 (111)
| 
| 8.17 (65)
| Punt Road Oval
| 3,500
| 30 May 1942

Round 5

|- bgcolor="#CCCCFF"
| Home team
| Home team score
| Away team
| Away team score
| Venue
| Crowd
| Date
|- bgcolor="#FFFFFF"
| 
| 11.13 (79)
| 
| 12.11 (83)
| Brunswick Street Oval
| 9,000
| 6 June 1942
|- bgcolor="#FFFFFF"
| 
| 15.19 (109)
| 
| 9.15 (69)
| Windy Hill
| 10,000
| 6 June 1942
|- bgcolor="#FFFFFF"
| 
| 23.10 (148)
| 
| 16.19 (115)
| Princes Park
| 5,500
| 6 June 1942
|- bgcolor="#FFFFFF"
| 
| 13.10 (88)
| 
| 10.20 (80)
| Glenferrie Oval
| 4,000
| 6 June 1942
|- bgcolor="#FFFFFF"
| 
| 15.14 (104)
| 
| 10.17 (77)
| Punt Road Oval
| 20,000
| 6 June 1942

Round 6

|- bgcolor="#CCCCFF"
| Home team
| Home team score
| Away team
| Away team score
| Venue
| Crowd
| Date
|- bgcolor="#FFFFFF"
| 
| 6.9 (45)
| 
| 13.11 (89)
| Punt Road Oval
| 4,000
| 13 June 1942
|- bgcolor="#FFFFFF"
| 
| 10.17 (77)
| 
| 11.10 (76)
| Windy Hill
| 18,000
| 13 June 1942
|- bgcolor="#FFFFFF"
| 
| 11.12 (78)
| 
| 11.21 (87)
| Victoria Park
| 5,500
| 13 June 1942
|- bgcolor="#FFFFFF"
| 
| 20.18 (138)
| 
| 13.13 (91)
| Princes Park
| 7,000
| 13 June 1942
|- bgcolor="#FFFFFF"
| 
| 11.17 (83)
| 
| 9.15 (69)
| Toorak Park
| 10,000
| 13 June 1942

Round 7

|- bgcolor="#CCCCFF"
| Home team
| Home team score
| Away team
| Away team score
| Venue
| Crowd
| Date
|- bgcolor="#FFFFFF"
| 
| 10.9 (69)
| 
| 11.20 (86)
| Punt Road Oval
| 18,000
| 20 June 1942
|- bgcolor="#FFFFFF"
| 
| 16.14 (110)
| 
| 14.10 (94)
| Brunswick Street Oval
| 5,000
| 20 June 1942
|- bgcolor="#FFFFFF"
| 
| 11.10 (76)
| 
| 12.11 (83)
| Arden Street Oval
| 4,000
| 20 June 1942
|- bgcolor="#FFFFFF"
| 
| 11.14 (80)
| 
| 9.14 (68)
| Toorak Park
| 5,000
| 20 June 1942
|- bgcolor="#FFFFFF"
| 
| 12.19 (91)
| 
| 10.12 (72)
| Yarraville Oval
| 8,500
| 20 June 1942

Round 8

|- bgcolor="#CCCCFF"
| Home team
| Home team score
| Away team
| Away team score
| Venue
| Crowd
| Date
|- bgcolor="#FFFFFF"
| 
| 12.9 (81)
| 
| 15.15 (105)
| Brunswick Street Oval
| 17,000
| 27 June 1942
|- bgcolor="#FFFFFF"
| 
| 22.12 (144)
| 
| 5.8 (38)
| Windy Hill
| 6,000
| 27 June 1942
|- bgcolor="#FFFFFF"
| 
| 18.14 (122)
| 
| 10.11 (71)
| Princes Park
| 6,500
| 27 June 1942
|- bgcolor="#FFFFFF"
| 
| 9.8 (62)
| 
| 17.16 (118)
| Arden Street Oval
| 6,000
| 27 June 1942
|- bgcolor="#FFFFFF"
| 
| 11.14 (80)
| 
| 14.21 (105)
| Punt Road Oval
| 5,500
| 27 June 1942

Round 9

|- bgcolor="#CCCCFF"
| Home team
| Home team score
| Away team
| Away team score
| Venue
| Crowd
| Date
|- bgcolor="#FFFFFF"
| 
| 7.3 (45)
| 
| 11.9 (75)
| Yarraville Oval
| 9,500
| 4 July 1942
|- bgcolor="#FFFFFF"
| 
| 10.18 (78)
| 
| 12.7 (79)
| Victoria Park
| 6,000
| 4 July 1942
|- bgcolor="#FFFFFF"
| 
| 11.14 (80)
| 
| 11.11 (77)
| Punt Road Oval
| 5,000
| 4 July 1942
|- bgcolor="#FFFFFF"
| 
| 6.9 (45)
| 
| 4.15 (39)
| Toorak Park
| 4,500
| 4 July 1942
|- bgcolor="#FFFFFF"
| 
| 8.10 (58)
| 
| 12.14 (86)
| Glenferrie Oval
| 3,000
| 4 July 1942

Round 10

|- bgcolor="#CCCCFF"
| Home team
| Home team score
| Away team
| Away team score
| Venue
| Crowd
| Date
|- bgcolor="#FFFFFF"
| 
| 19.17 (131)
| 
| 7.18 (60)
| Yarraville Oval
| 6,000
| 11 July 1942
|- bgcolor="#FFFFFF"
| 
| 13.17 (95)
| 
| 10.7 (67)
| Princes Park
| 5,500
| 11 July 1942
|- bgcolor="#FFFFFF"
| 
| 12.10 (82)
| 
| 15.17 (107)
| Brunswick Street Oval
| 15,000
| 11 July 1942
|- bgcolor="#FFFFFF"
| 
| 17.8 (110)
| 
| 11.16 (82)
| Arden Street Oval
| 3,500
| 11 July 1942
|- bgcolor="#FFFFFF"
| 
| 12.19 (91)
| 
| 13.10 (88)
| Punt Road Oval
| 6,000
| 11 July 1942

Round 11

|- bgcolor="#CCCCFF"
| Home team
| Home team score
| Away team
| Away team score
| Venue
| Crowd
| Date
|- bgcolor="#FFFFFF"
| 
| 13.17 (95)
| 
| 19.13 (127)
| Glenferrie Oval
| 6,000
| 18 July 1942
|- bgcolor="#FFFFFF"
| 
| 10.15 (75)
| 
| 8.7 (55)
| Windy Hill
| 16,000
| 18 July 1942
|- bgcolor="#FFFFFF"
| 
| 21.9 (135)
| 
| 9.8 (62)
| Toorak Park
| 4,000
| 18 July 1942
|- bgcolor="#FFFFFF"
| 
| 14.11 (95)
| 
| 19.12 (126)
| Punt Road Oval
| 6,000
| 18 July 1942
|- bgcolor="#FFFFFF"
| 
| 11.11 (77)
| 
| 13.14 (92)
| Victoria Park
| 8,000
| 18 July 1942

Round 12

|- bgcolor="#CCCCFF"
| Home team
| Home team score
| Away team
| Away team score
| Venue
| Crowd
| Date
|- bgcolor="#FFFFFF"
| 
| 19.15 (129)
| 
| 17.20 (122)
| Yarraville Oval
| 15,000
| 25 July 1942
|- bgcolor="#FFFFFF"
| 
| 9.15 (69)
| 
| 15.21 (111)
| Victoria Park
| 8,000
| 25 July 1942
|- bgcolor="#FFFFFF"
| 
| 9.10 (64)
| 
| 6.16 (52)
| Arden Street Oval
| 3,000
| 25 July 1942
|- bgcolor="#FFFFFF"
| 
| 10.13 (73)
| 
| 12.14 (86)
| Toorak Park
| 8,000
| 25 July 1942
|- bgcolor="#FFFFFF"
| 
| 14.20 (104)
| 
| 12.12 (84)
| Punt Road Oval
| 6,000
| 25 July 1942

Round 13

|- bgcolor="#CCCCFF"
| Home team
| Home team score
| Away team
| Away team score
| Venue
| Crowd
| Date
|- bgcolor="#FFFFFF"
| 
| 8.9 (57)
| 
| 10.15 (75)
| Glenferrie Oval
| 3,500
| 1 August 1942
|- bgcolor="#FFFFFF"
| 
| 20.14 (134)
| 
| 10.8 (68)
| Brunswick Street Oval
| 5,500
| 1 August 1942
|- bgcolor="#FFFFFF"
| 
| 15.12 (102)
| 
| 10.8 (68)
| Windy Hill
| 14,000
| 1 August 1942
|- bgcolor="#FFFFFF"
| 
| 15.21 (111)
| 
| 12.14 (86)
| Punt Road Oval
| 9,000
| 1 August 1942
|- bgcolor="#FFFFFF"
| 
| 10.24 (84)
| 
| 12.17 (89)
| Princes Park
| 15,000
| 1 August 1942

Round 14

|- bgcolor="#CCCCFF"
| Home team
| Home team score
| Away team
| Away team score
| Venue
| Crowd
| Date
|- bgcolor="#FFFFFF"
| 
| 6.10 (46)
| 
| 13.11 (89)
| Toorak Park
| 3,500
| 8 August 1942
|- bgcolor="#FFFFFF"
| 
| 20.17 (137)
| 
| 9.4 (58)
| Yarraville Oval
| 2,500
| 8 August 1942
|- bgcolor="#FFFFFF"
| 
| 12.11 (83)
| 
| 16.21 (117)
| Victoria Park
| 3,500
| 8 August 1942
|- bgcolor="#FFFFFF"
| 
| 18.20 (128)
| 
| 11.9 (75)
| Princes Park
| 7,500
| 8 August 1942
|- bgcolor="#FFFFFF"
| 
| 12.13 (85)
| 
| 10.8 (68)
| Punt Road Oval
| 3,000
| 8 August 1942

Round 15

|- bgcolor="#CCCCFF"
| Home team
| Home team score
| Away team
| Away team score
| Venue
| Crowd
| Date
|- bgcolor="#FFFFFF"
| 
| 18.20 (128)
| 
| 8.8 (56)
| Punt Road Oval
| 7,000
| 15 August 1942
|- bgcolor="#FFFFFF"
| 
| 7.15 (57)
| 
| 16.22 (118)
| Glenferrie Oval
| 2,500
| 15 August 1942
|- bgcolor="#FFFFFF"
| 
| 22.13 (145)
| 
| 12.15 (87)
| Princes Park
| 5,000
| 15 August 1942
|- bgcolor="#FFFFFF"
| 
| 11.17 (83)
| 
| 9.10 (64)
| Windy Hill
| 8,000
| 15 August 1942
|- bgcolor="#FFFFFF"
| 
| 13.20 (98)
| 
| 17.13 (115)
| Brunswick Street Oval
| 13,000
| 15 August 1942

Round 16

|- bgcolor="#CCCCFF"
| Home team
| Home team score
| Away team
| Away team score
| Venue
| Crowd
| Date
|- bgcolor="#FFFFFF"
| 
| 14.7 (91)
| 
| 14.23 (107)
| Punt Road Oval
| 10,000
| 22 August 1942
|- bgcolor="#FFFFFF"
| 
| 16.21 (117)
| 
| 15.13 (103)
| Victoria Park
| 2,000
| 22 August 1942
|- bgcolor="#FFFFFF"
| 
| 18.19 (127)
| 
| 10.14 (74)
| Princes Park
| 26,000
| 22 August 1942
|- bgcolor="#FFFFFF"
| 
| 19.15 (129)
| 
| 14.8 (92)
| Yarraville Oval
| 8,000
| 22 August 1942
|- bgcolor="#FFFFFF"
| 
| 5.8 (38)
| 
| 8.16 (64)
| Arden Street Oval
| 4,000
| 22 August 1942

Ladder

Finals

Semi finals

|- bgcolor="#CCCCFF"
| Home team
| Score
| Away team
| Score
| Venue
| Crowd
| Date
|- bgcolor="#FFFFFF"
| 
| 13.13 (91)
| 
| 7.22 (64)
| Princes Park
| 25,000
| 29 August
|- bgcolor="#FFFFFF"
| 
| 8.8 (56)
| 
| 11.12 (78)
| Princes Park
| 32,000
| 5 September

Preliminary Final

|- bgcolor="#CCCCFF"
| Home team
| Score
| Away team
| Score
| Venue
| Crowd
| Date
|- bgcolor="#FFFFFF"
| 
| 19.10 (124)
| 
| 14.12 (96)
| Princes Park
| 26,000
| 12 September

Grand final

Essendon defeated Richmond 19.18 (132) to 11.13 (79), in front of a crowd of 49,000 (approx.) people at Princes Park. (For an explanation of scoring see Australian rules football).

Awards
 The 1942 VFL Premiership team was Essendon.
 The VFL's leading goalkicker was Lindsay White of South Melbourne with 67 goals (80 after finals); White usually played for Geelong, but transferred to South Melbourne because Geelong had withdrawn from the war-time competition.
 No Brownlow Medal was awarded in 1942.
 Hawthorn took the "wooden spoon" in 1942.
St Kilda 13.10 (88) defeated  7.15 (57) in the Grand Final, played as a stand-alone match on 12 September at the Punt Road Oval.

Notable events
 In Round 2, Melbourne and Richmond set the record for the highest aggregate score in a game, with the teams combining for 48.25 (313). This record would stand for thirty years, eventually being broken in the 1972 Grand Final.
 Melbourne was led on to the field by RAAF air ace Squadron Leader Keith "Bluey" Truscott, DFC and Bar. Truscott unfurled Melbourne's 1941 premiership flag and, very obviously lacking match condition, played an average game, kicking a single goal in his team's 79-point loss, which proved the last of his fifty career senior games).
 The second half of the 1942 Grand Final was delayed as the captains Jack Dyer and Dick Reynolds, both of whom were in "reserved" occupations and, therefore, exempt from military service (Dyer was a police officer, and Reynolds a munitions worker), made speeches to the crowd in support of the wartime Austerity Loan.
 On Sunday 12 July at the Punt Road Oval, a Combined Services Team, which included Percy Beames, Allan La Fontaine, Jack Mueller, Alby Pannam, and Norman Ware, played a match against a combined team of VFL players chosen by the Lord Mayor of Melbourne, former Olympic swimming champion Sir Frank Beaurepaire, which included Norm Smith, Jack Dyer, and Bob Chitty.
 On Saturday, 26 September, the premiers, Essendon played a patriotic match against a Combined Services Team that included former VFL stars Laurie Nash, Bob Pratt and Ron Todd (all of whom had been lost to the VFL since crossing to the Victorian Football Association before the war). Essendon won 24.18 (162) to 20.15 (135) before a crowd of 10,000 at Princes Park.
 Hawthorn recorded its only win of the season over Collingwood in Round 5, the first time that the Hawks had beaten the Magpies since they joined the VFL in 1925 after 29 losses. Hawthorn were to lose nineteen in a row to the Magpies between 1944 and 1954 before its first peacetime victory in Round 4, 1955.

References

 Hogan, P., The Tigers of Old, The Richmond Football Club, (Richmond), 1996. 
 Maplestone, M., Flying Higher: History of the Essendon Football Club 1872–1996, Essendon Football Club, (Melbourne), 1996. 
 Rogers, S. & Brown, A., Every Game Ever Played: VFL/AFL Results 1897–1997 (Sixth Edition), Viking Books, (Ringwood), 1998. 
 Ross, J. (ed), 100 Years of Australian Football 1897–1996: The Complete Story of the AFL, All the Big Stories, All the Great Pictures, All the Champions, Every AFL Season Reported, Viking, (Ringwood), 1996.

External links
 1942 Season - AFL Tables

Australian Football League seasons
Vfl season